The Calgary Roughnecks are a lacrosse team based in Calgary playing in the National Lacrosse League (NLL). The 2017 season is the 16th in franchise history.

Final standings

Game log

Regular season

Entry Draft
The 2016 NLL Entry Draft took place on September 26, 2016. The Roughnecks made the following selections:

See also
2017 NLL season

References

Calgary
Calgary Roughnecks seasons
Calgary Roughnecks